Donald Francis Snow (September 6, 1877 – February 12, 1958) was a member of the US House of Representatives from Maine.

Early life and education
Snow was born in Bangor, Maine on September 6, 1877. He attended the public schools of his native city and was graduated from Bowdoin College, in Brunswick, Maine, in 1901. He later attended the law school of the University of Maine, earning a Juris Doctor in 1904.

Political career
He was elected city solicitor of Bangor in 1906, serving until 1910; and he was prosecuting attorney of Penobscot County, Maine from 1911 to 1913.

Snow was elected as a Republican to the Seventy-first and Seventy-second Congresses, serving from March 4, 1929, to March 3, 1933. He was unsuccessful candidate for renomination in 1932.

Business career
Snow engaged in literary work in Washington, D.C. from 1933 to 1935. Snow moved to Gorham, Maine in 1936 and engaged in poultry farming until 1945. He was secretary for the E.C. Jones Insurance Corp of Portland, Maine, and later had his own insurance business.

Embezzlement conviction
In April 1935, Snow was committed to the Maine State Prison for two to four years for embezzlement, convicted of converting to his own use funds from two estates of which he was serving as executor.  He was pardoned in December 1935.

Death
He died in Gorham, Maine on February 12, 1958.  He was originally buried at Evergreen Cemetery in Portland, and later re-interred at Eastern Cemetery in Gorham.

See also
 List of federal political scandals in the United States

References

External links

  – reburial in Gorham, Maine
  – original grave in Portland, Maine

1877 births
1958 deaths
Bowdoin College alumni
Maine politicians convicted of crimes
People from Gorham, Maine
Politicians from Bangor, Maine
Recipients of American gubernatorial pardons
Republican Party members of the United States House of Representatives from Maine
University of Maine School of Law alumni